(Behold, what a love has the Father shown to us), 64, is a church cantata by Johann Sebastian Bach. He composed the Christmas cantata in Leipzig in 1723 for the third day of Christmas, which is also the Feast of John the Evangelist, and first performed it on 27 December 1723.

History and text 
Bach wrote the cantata in his first year as Thomaskantor in Leipzig, as part of his first cantata cycle, for the Third Day of Christmas. The prescribed readings for the day are from the Epistle to the Hebrews, Christ is higher than the angels, and the prologue of the Gospel of John, also called Hymn to the Word. The unknown poet referred only in a general way to the readings and stressed the aspect that being loved by God in the way which Christmas shows, the believer does not have to be concerned about the "world" any more. Possibly these works were written by the same author. The only Christmas chorale is verse 7 of Luther's "" as movement 2. Movement 4 is the first verse of Balthasar Kindermann's "". The cantata is concluded by "", verse 5 of Johann Franck's "". Bach first performed the cantata on 27 December 1723.

Scoring and structure 
The cantata is scored for soprano, alto and bass soloists, a four-part choir, zink and three trombones, oboe d'amore, two violins, viola, and basso continuo.

 Chorus: 
 Chorale: 
 Recitative (alto): 
 Chorale: 
 Aria (soprano): 
 Recitative (bass): 
 Aria (alto): 
 Chorale:

Music 

The opening chorus is set in motet style; an archaic-sounding choir of trombones doubles the voices. The alto recitative is accompanied by vigorous scales in the continuo. In the soprano aria, a Gavotte, a virtuoso solo violin possibly represents the "worldly things". The alto aria is accompanied by the oboe d'amore in melodic lyricism. The chorale "" (Good night, existence) is set for four parts.

Recordings 
 Bach Cantatas Vol. 1 – Advent and Christmas, Karl Richter, Münchener Bach-Chor, Münchener Bach-Orchester, Edith Mathis, Anna Reynolds, Dietrich Fischer-Dieskau, Archiv Produktion 1972
 Die Bach Kantate Vol. 63, Helmuth Rilling, Gächinger Kantorei, Bach-Collegium Stuttgart, Arleen Augér, Ann Murray, Philippe Huttenlocher, Hänssler 1981
 J. S. Bach: Complete Cantatas Vol. 8, Ton Koopman, Amsterdam Baroque Orchestra & Choir, Dorothea Röschmann, Bogna Bartosz, Klaus Mertens, Antoine Marchand 1998
 J. S. Bach: Cantatas Vol. 13, Masaaki Suzuki, Bach Collegium Japan, Yukari Nonoshita, Robin Blaze, Peter Kooy, BIS 1999
 Bach Cantatas Vol. 15: New York, John Eliot Gardiner, Monteverdi Choir, English Baroque Soloists, Gillian Keith, Robin Tyson, Peter Harvey, Soli Deo Gloria 2000

References

Sources 
 
 Sehet, welch eine Liebe hat uns der Vater erzeiget BWV 64; BC A 15 / Sacred cantata (3rd Christmas Day) Bach Digital
 Cantata BWV 64 Sehet, welch eine Liebe hat uns der Vater erzeiget: history, scoring, sources for text and music, translations to various languages, discography, discussion, Bach Cantatas Website
 BWV 64 Sehet, welch eine Liebe hat uns der Vater erzeiget: English translation, University of Vermont
 BWV 64 Sehet, welch eine Liebe hat uns der Vater erzeiget: text, scoring, University of Alberta
 Chapter 32 BWV 64 Sehet, welch eine Liebe hat uns der Vater erzeiget / See what love the Father has shown us.: a listener and student guide by Julian Mincham, 2010
 Luke Dahn: BWV 64.2, BWV 64.4, BWV 64.8 bach-chorales.com

Church cantatas by Johann Sebastian Bach
1723 compositions
Christmas cantatas